The Heinkel He 280 was the first turbojet-powered fighter aircraft in the world. It was inspired by Ernst Heinkel's emphasis on research into high-speed flight and built on the company's experience with the He 178 jet prototype. A combination of technical and political factors led to it being passed over in favor of the Messerschmitt Me 262. Only nine were built and none reached operational status.

Development
The Heinkel company began the He 280 project on its own initiative after the He 178 had failed to interest the Reichsluftfahrtministerium (R.L.M.) (the German Reich Aviation Ministry). The head designer was Robert Lusser, who began the project under the designation He 180 in late 1939. It had a typical Heinkel fighter fuselage, semi-elliptical wings and a dihedralled tailplane with twin fins and rudders. It had a tricycle undercarriage with very little ground clearance. This arrangement was considered too frail for the grass or dirt airfields of the era; however, the tricycle layout eventually gained acceptance. The He 280 was equipped with a compressed-air powered ejection seat, the first aircraft to carry one and the first aircraft to successfully employ one in an emergency.

The first prototype was completed in the summer of 1940, but the HeS 8 intended to power it was running into difficulties. On 22 September 1940, while work on the engine continued, the first prototype started glide tests with ballasted pods hung in place of its engines, towed behind a He 111. It was another six months before Fritz Schäfer flew the second prototype under its own power, on 30 March 1941.  On 5 April 1941, Paul Bader made an exhibition flight to Ernst Udet, General-Ingenieur Lucht, Reidenbach, Eisenlohr and others. Yet, the RLM eventually favored development of the Me 262, though Heinkel was given Hirth Motoren for continued turbine development. 

One benefit of the He 280 which did impress the political leadership was the fact that the jet engines could burn kerosene, which requires much less expense and refining than the high-octane fuel used by piston-engine aircraft. However, government funding was lacking at the critical stage of initial development.

Over the next year, progress was slow due to the ongoing engine problems. A second engine design, the HeS 30 was also under development, both as an interesting engine in its own right and as  a potential replacement for the HeS 8. In the meantime, alternative powerplants were considered, including the Argus As 014 pulsejet that powered the V-1 flying bomb. It was proposed that up to eight be used.

By the end of 1943, however, the third prototype was fitted with refined versions of the HeS 8 engine and was ready for its next demonstration. On 22 December, a mock dogfight was staged for RLM officials in which the He 280 was matched against an Fw 190, in which the jet demonstrated its vastly superior speed, completing four laps of an oval course before the Fw 190 could complete three. Finally, at this point the RLM became interested and placed an order for 20 pre-production test aircraft, to be followed by 300 production machines.

Engine problems continued to plague the project. In 1942, the RLM had ordered Heinkel to abandon the HeS 8 and HeS 30 to focus all development on a follow-on engine, the HeS 011, a more advanced and problematic design. Meanwhile, the first He 280 prototype was re-equipped with pulsejets and towed aloft to test them. Bad weather caused the aircraft to ice up, and before the jets could be tested pilot Helmut Schenk became the first person to put an ejection seat to use. The seat worked perfectly, but the aircraft was lost and never found.

With the HeS 011 not expected for some time, Heinkel selected the rival BMW 003. However, this engine also had problems and delays. The second He 280 prototype was re-engined with Junkers Jumo 004s while the next three airframes were earmarked for the BMW motor, which was ultimately unavailable. The Jumo engines were much larger and heavier than the HeS 8 that the aircraft had been designed for, and while it flew well enough on its first powered flights from 16 March 1943, it was clear that this engine was unsuitable. The aircraft was slower and generally less efficient than the Me 262.

Less than two weeks later, on 27 March, Erhard Milch cancelled the project. The Jumo 004-powered Me 262 appeared to have most of the qualities of the He 280, but was better matched to its engine. Heinkel was ordered to abandon the He 280 and focus attention on bomber development and construction, something he remained bitter about until his death.

Prototypes

He 280 V1
 Stammkennzeichen-coded as "DL+AS".
 1940-09-22: First flight.
 1942-01-13: Crashed due to control failure. Pilot ejected safely.

He 280 V2
 Coded as "GJ+CA".
 1941-03-30: First flight.
 1943-06-26: Crashed due to engine failure.

He 280 V3
 Coded as "GJ+CB".
 1942-07-05: First flight.
 1945-05: Captured at Heinkel-Sud factory complex at Wien-Schwechat, Austria.

He 280 V4
 Coded as "GJ+CC".
 1943-08-31: First flight.
 1944-10: Struck off charge at Hörsching, Austria.

He 280 V5
 Coded as "GJ+CD".
 1943-07-26: First flight.
 Did not receive any jet engines.

He 280 V6
 Coded as "NU+EA".
 1943-07-26: First flight.
 powered by Junkers Jumo 109-004A engines

He 280 V7
 Coded as "NU+EB" and "D-IEXM".
 1943-04-19: First flight.
 Flew a total of 115 towed flights. Flew powered with Heinkel-Hirth 109-001 engines until an engine failure, reverting to a glider.

He 280 V8
 Coded as "NU+EC".
 1943-07-19: First flight.

He 280 V9
 Coded as "NU+ED".
 1943-08-31: First flight.

Specifications (He 280 V6)

See also

References

 "Harbinger of an Era...The Heinkel He 280". Air International, November 1989, Vol 37 No 6. ISSN 0306-5634. pp. 233–241, 260.

External links
 He 280 film clips (YouTube, posted on Nov 13, 2016)

1940s German fighter aircraft
World War II jet aircraft of Germany
He 280
Twinjets
Aircraft first flown in 1940